Blood Wars is a free Polish MMORPG in which players play as vampires in a post nuclear world and have to fight for dominance in the only city that survived the apocalypse.

Blood Wars has been released on January 8, 2006 and is developed and maintained by BW Team. Current language versions available are English, French, Polish, Russian and Turkish. There are 16 playable realms with over 200,000 accounts total.

References

External links
 
 Developer website

Browser games
Browser-based multiplayer online games
Video games about vampires
2006 video games
Online text-based role-playing games
Massively multiplayer online role-playing games
Video games developed in Poland